Anania fuscalis is a species of moth of the family Crambidae. It is found in Europe.

The wingspan is 20–26 mm. The forewings are grey, slightly yellowish tinged; lines darker grey, first indistinct, hardly curved, second serrate, strongly curved in disc, with an abrupt sinuation inwards below middle, posteriorly obscurely whitish edged, more strongly on costa; orbicular dot and transverse discal mark indistinct, darker grey. Hindwings are pale grey, yellowish-tinged; two very faint discal dots; second line as in forewings; a darker grey terminal band.T he larva is rather dark fuscous; dorsal line darker; spiracular area pale brownish; head and plate of 2 blackish -brown.

The moth flies from May to July depending on the location.

The larvae feed on Rhinanthus minor and Melampyrum pratense, but also Solidago, Urtica, Lathyrus and Pedicularis species.

References

External links
 "Anania fuscalis (Denis & Schiffermüller, 1775)". Fauna Europaea. Retrieved January 21, 2018.
 "63.016 BF1386 Anania fuscalis ([Denis & Schiffermüller], 1775)". UKMoths. Retrieved January 21, 2018.
 "Anania fuscalis ([Denis & Schiffermüller], 1775)". Catalogue of the Lepidoptera of Belgium. Retrieved January 21, 2018.
 

Pyraustinae
Moths of Europe
Moths described in 1775